Jani Kovačič (born 14 June 1992) is a Slovenian volleyball player who plays for ACH Volley and the Slovenian national team. With Slovenia, he competed at the 2015 European Championship.

Sporting achievements

Club
 National championships
 2009–10  Slovenian Championship, with Salonit Anhovo
 2014–15  Austrian Championship, with SK Aich/Dob
 2016–17  Slovenian Championship, with ACH Volley
 2017–18  Slovenian Championship, with ACH Volley
 2018–19  Slovenian Championship, with ACH Volley

Individual awards
 2019: CEV European Championship – Best Libero

References

External links

 
 Player profile at LegaVolley.it 
 Player profile at Volleybox.net

1992 births
Living people
People from Šempeter pri Gorici
Slovenian men's volleyball players
Slovenian expatriate sportspeople in Austria
Expatriate volleyball players in Austria
Slovenian expatriate sportspeople in France
Expatriate volleyball players in France
Slovenian expatriate sportspeople in Italy
Expatriate volleyball players in Italy
Liberos